Dozy is a Dutch surname, it may refer to:

 Frans Dozy (1807–1856), bryologist
 Iman Dozy  (1887–1957), Dutch football player
 Jean Jacques Dozy (1908–2004), Dutch geologist who discovered the Ertsberg in New Guinea
 Reinhart Dozy  (1820–1883), Dutch scholar of Arabic
 Trevor Ward-Davies (1944–2015), bass guitarist in the 1960s British band Dave Dee, Dozy, Beaky, Mick & Tich